Merry Christmas is the fourth studio album by American singer-songwriter Mariah Carey, and her first Christmas album. Released by Columbia Records on October 28, 1994, at the peak of the initial stretch of Carey's career, between Music Box (1993) and Daydream (1995), the album features cover versions of popular Christmas songs in addition to original material. Carey worked with Walter Afanasieff, with whom she wrote all of the original tracks, as well as producing Carey's interpretations of the covered material. Three singles were released from the album, of which "All I Want for Christmas Is You" went on to become one of the best-selling singles of all time and the best-selling Christmas ringtone in the United States.

Critical response to the album's contemporary Christmas theme was mixed. Some music critics complimented the "gospel and soul-inflected" vocals and even called it "Carey's best record" to date. Re-released on multiple occasions in various formats since its debut, the album has sold 5.7 million copies in the United States as of December 2019 and has been certified eight times platinum by the Recording Industry Association of America (RIAA). Internationally, it reached number one in Japan, Latvia, and Lithuania. It achieved top-ten in 16 additional countries including Australia, Canada, the Netherlands, New Zealand, Sweden, Switzerland, and the United States.

In 2005, the album was re-released as a special edition DualDisc, featuring "God Rest Ye Merry Gentlemen" and a special anniversary version of "Santa Claus is Comin' To Town" on the CD side. The DVD side features the entire album in enhanced PCM stereo and music videos. In 2010, Carey released a sequel Christmas album, Merry Christmas II You. In 2019, an anniversary deluxe edition was released featuring live renditions, newer songs like "Oh Santa!" and "The Star", and numerous remixes in commemoration of the album's twenty-fifth anniversary. As of 2021, Merry Christmas has sold 15 million copies worldwide, becoming one of the best-selling holiday albums of all time.

Background 
Carey has expressed her belief in God and the connection between music and spirituality, and felt the album was finally a way to portray her spirituality through music. After the success of Carey's previous effort, Music Box, there was speculation of a new project in the works; however it was not until October 1994, only one month before the album's release, that Billboard announced Carey would be releasing an album for the Christmas season. Initially, critics were shocked; they did not know how Carey would fare as an entertainer across genres, as she had previously only been viewed as a pop star. Nevertheless, Carey, unaffected by the speculation, continued working on and promoting the album in high spirits, confident in her work. The idea proved to be wise, earning Carey recognition in various markets including Christian radio and contemporary R&B stations, as well as extended her fame in Japan, where the album experienced much of its success.

Conception and composition 

Throughout the album's development, Carey worked extensively with Walter Afanasieff, with whom she collaborated extensively on Emotions (1991) and Music Box (1993). Together, they wrote all three of the album's original songs, as well as producing most of the traditional tracks at The Hit Factory, in New York.

Merry Christmas boasted a variety of musical arrangements, sounds, and genres. Carey's goal was to provide an album that would have a "Christmas feel", providing a mixture of soulful tracks, as well as fun and joyous holiday treats. The song "Jesus Oh What a Wonderful Child", produced by Carey, Afannasief, and Holland, was described as an arrangement of a traditional gospel standard that "really took flight". The song was recorded in a church, with many live backup singers and children playing tambourines and other melodious instruments. The goal was to produce a "real church flavored song", in which Loris Holland played the keyboards and allowed Carey's voice to "cut loose". According to Chris Nickson, Carey's love of gospel music came through on the track, writing, "[she] led the band without pushing herself forward, letting the song develop and work out, trading lines with the chorus until, after the crescendo, the musicians moved into a fast double-time to the end."

"All I Want for Christmas Is You", the album's lead single was described as an "up-tempo love song, one that could have easily been written for Tommy Mottola". "Miss You Most (At Christmas Time)", another one of the album's original tracks, was very different from its predecessor. The song was described as a "sad ballad", in line with many of Carey's previous hit singles. The song featured a synthesized orchestra, including keyboard notes courtesy of Afanasieff, during which Carey would sing to her "long-gone lover, crystallizing the way that Christmas brought memories of the past into focus." According to Nickson "Jesus Born on This Day" was the most impressive original track on the album. It was described as a "full-blown production number", which again featured synthesized orchestra, as well as a live children's choir. The song's tune was described as "solemn and hymn-like, but the arrangement, oddly, made it less religious and rather more glitzy, behind the lyrics that overtly praised Jesus."

In addition, Carey recorded a cover of "Christmas (Baby Please Come Home)" by Darlene Love, as well as classics such as "Silent Night", "O Holy Night" and "Joy to the World". The latter song, which was used as a promotional single, was remixed several times and sent to various clubs; adding to the album's range of listeners. Record producer and composer, Loris Holland, co-produced some of the albums gospel flavored tracks, including "Silent Night", where he arranged the backing vocals and synthesizers. Carey's rendition of "Santa Claus Is Coming to Town", was deemed as "one of the more playful tracks on the album", alongside "Christmas (Baby Please Come Home)".

Promotion 

In the United States, Carey started promotion for Merry Christmas with a live concert at the Cathedral of St. John the Divine on December 8, 1994, performing for the first time several tracks from the album, including "All I Want for Christmas Is You", which was later performed on several of her concert tours, including the Japanese shows of Carey's Daydream World Tour (1996), Butterfly World Tour (1998), Rainbow World Tour (2000), Charmbracelet World Tour (2003) and The Adventures of Mimi Tour (2006), due to the massive success of the song in Japan, which became her best-selling single in the country. On December 25, 2001, she appeared on the Christmas special BET Christmas Remembrances Special, where she performed "Joy to the World" and her hit "One Sweet Day" with Boyz II Men. Three years later, she appeared in 2004 Walt Disney World Christmas Day Parade, where she performed "Joy to the World" and "All I Want for Christmas is You".

On December 3, 2008, she performed "Christmas (Baby Please Come Home)" at the 2008 Grammy Nomination Concert. A year later, Carey sang the So So Def remix version of "All I Want for Christmas is You" at the opening night of her Angels Advocate Tour on New Year's Eve. Other live performances of  "All I Want for Christmas is You" includes the 2010 Walt Disney World Christmas Day Parade, Christmas In Rockefeller Center (in 2012, 2013 and 2014) and Late Night with Jimmy Fallon in 2012, where she performed the song alongside Jimmy Fallon and The Roots. Carey also performed "All I Want for Christmas is You" with Michael Bublé for his third Annual Christmas Special in December 2013. She also performed the song at the 91st Annual National Christmas Tree Lighting on December 16, 2013.

During The Late Late Show with James Corden on December 15, 2016, Carey sang "All I Want for Christmas is You" on the popular feature Carpool Karaoke. Fellow singers Adele, Lady Gaga, Demi Lovato, Nick Jonas, Elton John, Selena Gomez, Gwen Stefani, Coldplay's Chris Martin and the band Red Hot Chili Peppers were featured in the video. Carey also performed the song at The Wonderful World of Disney: Magical Holiday Celebration, VH1 Divas Holiday: Unsilent Night and Disney Parks Magical Christmas Celebration in 2016. In December 2019, Carey returned to The Late Late Show to perform the song for its 25th anniversary.

To celebrate the 20th anniversary of Merry Christmas, Carey embarked on her first Christmas concert residency, All I Want For Christmas Is You, A Night of Joy & Festivity, which began on December 15, 2014, at the Beacon Theatre in New York City, and ended on December 15, 2019, after completing eight legs and fifty-six shows in North America and Europe. On December 1, 2020, Carey performed a medley of "Heroes", "Hero", and "Joy to the World" at Good Morning America, two days prior to her Christmas special Mariah Carey's Magical Christmas Special, where she re-recorded and performed several songs from the album. The following year, she performed "Christmas (Baby Please Come Home)" and a new song, "Fall in Love at Christmas", during her 2021 Christmas Special Mariah's Christmas: The Magic Continues. She also performed "All I Want for Christmas is You" at the 2022 Macy's Thanksgiving Day Parade.

Singles 
Merry Christmas was supported by three commercial singles and two promotional singles, with different releases depending on the country. The album's lead single, "All I Want for Christmas Is You", was released on October 29, 1994, in Japan, and in other countries the next month. While it was not initially commercially released in the United States, Billboard described Columbia's level of promotion as unprecedented for a Christmas album. On November 14, 1994, the label released three songs to US radio stations as promotional singles: "All I Want for Christmas Is You" (top 40 and adult contemporary radio stations), "Jesus Born on This Day" (Christian and gospel stations), and
"Miss You Most (At Christmas Time)" (R&B stations). The latter was also commercially released that year, including in the Philippines where it served as the lead single in that country. Originally released in 1994 as a 12-inch promotional single of dance remixes, "Joy to the World" was released in Australia as the album's third single on November 27, 1995, becoming a top-forty hit there. "O Holy Night" was released as a promotional single in 1996, and later peaked at number 19 in Iceland, at number 28 in Italy, at number 70 on the US Holiday 100 chart, and at number 153 in France; later being certified Gold in the United States, Canada and Italy.

"All I Want for Christmas Is You" is Carey's biggest international hit of her career, breaking several records worldwide and topping the charts in over 25 countries, including Australia, Canada, France, Germany, the UK Singles chart and the US  Billboard Hot 100, becoming the best-selling Christmas song by a female artist and one of the best-selling singles of all time, selling over 16 million copies worldwide. The song was certified 12× Platinum in the US, becoming the first holiday song to achieve this. It is also Carey's best-selling single in the UK, where it was certified seven-times Platinum, becoming the highest-certified song of all time by a female artist in the country. It is also her best-selling single in Canada, Australia and Germany, where it was certified Diamond, 9× Platinum and 2× Platinum, respectively.

Other songs from the album also achieved success worldwide:
Her version of Darlene Love's "Christmas (Baby Please Come Home)" reached the top-twenty on the US Holiday 100 chart, and the top-forty in Latvia, Lithuania, Slovakia and the Netherlands; and was certified Platinum in the United States and Canada, Gold in Australia, and Silver in the United Kingdom. 
Her version of "Santa Claus is Comin' to Town" peaked at number 26 in Hungary, at number 45 on the US Holiday 100, and at number 142 in South Korea; and was also certified Gold in Australia, Canada and the United States.
Her version of "Silent Night" also charted at number 95 in the Netherlands. 
"Hark! The Herald Angels Sing" / "Gloria (In Excelsis Deo)" also charted on the US Holiday 100 at number 54, and was certified Gold in the United States.

Critical reception 

In the Los Angeles Times, Chris Willman wrote that Carey "attempts her share of girl-group pop amid the quasi-gospel melisma, though still not evidencing as much personality as talent in either style". The New York Times journalist Jon Pareles was more critical in his review. "Regardless of backup, Ms. Carey oversings, glutting songs with her vocal tics—like sliding down from the note above the melody note—and turning expressions of devotion into narcissistic displays." Chris Dickinson from the Chicago Tribune called the singer a "trilling songbird" and "over-the-top irritant" throughout the album, particularly on "All I Want for Christmas Is You", where she "sounds like a bush-league Petula Clark". The newspaper later named it the seventh worst Christmas album ever.

J. D. Considine was more enthusiastic in The Baltimore Sun. In his opinion, Merry Christmas "may look like just another attempt to cash in on Christmas cheer, but is actually the work of someone who genuinely loves this music". Considine said while Carey's gospel and soul-inflected vocal exercises worked well with the traditional songs, "the album's real strength is the conviction she brings to otherwise corny fare like "Santa Claus Is Comin' to Town", while the way she augments "Joy to the World" with a bit of the Three Dog Night hit is pure genius." Steve Morse from The Boston Globe argued that it was perhaps Carey's best record, on which she abandoned the overly polished sound of her previous albums and "cut loose with unbridled soul".

In a retrospective review, Barry Schwartz of Stylus Magazine believed Merry Christmas may have been "the definitive Mariah Carey album", finding the singer at "her absolute creative and commercial peak, her voice still a marvel, her songs and performances still undeniably brilliant". AllMusic editor Roch Parisien deemed "All I Want for Christmas Is You" the record's highlight while lamenting Carey's "high opera" pretensions on "O Holy Night" and her dance/club rendition of "Joy to the World".

Commercial performance 

Merry Christmas was released in the United States on November 1, 1994, and debuted at number thirty on the US Billboard 200 with 45,000 copies sold in its first week. In its fifth week, the album peaked at number three, with sales of 208,000 copies, but experienced its highest sales in its sixth week (when it was at number six), with another 500,000 copies sold. The album was the second best-selling holiday album that year with a total of 1,859,000 copies sold. It remained in the top twenty for eight weeks and on the Billboard 200 for thirteen weeks, reentering the chart three times; peaking at number 149 the first time, 115 the second and at 61 the third (it has spent a total of 100 weeks on the chart). On December 14, 2020, Merry Christmas was certified eight-times Platinum by the Recording Industry Association of America (RIAA) for shipment of eight million copies in the US. As of December 2019, the album has sold 5.7 million copies in the US and is one of the best-selling holiday albums in the United States. In 2021, the album was named by Billboard as the third Greatest Holiday Album of All Time.

Merry Christmas became Carey's first number-one album in Japan, where the album experienced its highest sales, where it sold 2.8 million copies and became the fourth best-selling album by a non-Asian solo artist.

In Europe, Merry Christmas experienced success, peaking at number one in Latvia and Lithuania; at number two in Sweden and the Netherlands; at number three in Italy; at number four in Austria, Belgium, Denmark, Iceland, Norway, and Switzerland; and at number five in Estonia. It also reached the top-ten in Finland, Greece, Italy, Portugal, and the European Top 100 Albums. To date, Merry Christmas was certified three-times Platinum in Denmark and Norway, both by IFPI. It was also certified 2× Platinum in Italy; Platinum in the Netherlands; and Gold in Austria, Germany, and Switzerland. In the United Kingdom, Merry Christmas peaked at number 32 on the UK Albums chart, and it was certified Platinum. Additionally, Merry Christmas became the first Christmas album to reach number one on the UK R&B Albums chart, as the album topped the chart during the week of November 8, 2019, becoming Carey's eleventh number-one album on the chart, replacing Kanye West's Jesus Is King, and being replaced by Post Malone's Hollywood's Bleeding.

In Australia, the album peaked at number two, and was certified six-times Platinum, denoting shipments of 420,000 copies and finishing 11th on the Australian Recording Industry Association (ARIA) 1994 End of Year Chart. Merry Christmas has sold 15 million copies worldwide, and stands as one of the best selling holiday albums in world history.

Track listing 
All tracks are produced by Walter Afanasieff and Mariah Carey, except where noted.

Notes
 signifies a co-producer

Sample credits
 "Joy to the World" contains an interpolation of "Joy to the World" by Three Dog Night (1971)

Personnel 
Credits adapted from the album's liner notes.

Musicians

 3D – children's choir (7)
 Mariah Carey – background vocals (6–8, 10), lead vocals
 Walter Afanasieff – claps (10), Hammond B-3 organ (3, 6, 8), keyboards (2–9),  synthesizer (2, 3), tambourine (10)
 David Daniels – children's choir (7)
 Melonie Daniels – background vocals (1–10)
 Nathan Daniels – children's choir (7)
 Wayne Daniels Jr. – children's choir (7)
 Bernard Davis – drums (10)
 Omar Hakim – drums (4, 8)
 Loris Holland – Hammond B-3 organ (1, 9, 10), piano (1, 9, 10)
 Dann Huff – guitar (2–4, 6, 8)
 Randy Jackson – bass guitar (4, 8)
 Kirk Lyons – bass guitar (10)
 Cindy Mizelle – background vocals (9)
 Tobitha Shinique Owens – children's choir (7)
 Greg Phillinganes – piano (4, 8)
 Lenny Pickett – baritone saxophone (4), tenor saxophone (4)
 Kelly Price – background vocals (1–10)
 Shanrae Price – background vocals (1–10)
 David Silliman – percussion (4, 8)
 Janaye Walton – children's choir (7)
 Jazzmin Walton – children's choir (7)
 Jodi Walton – children's choir (7)
 Buddy Williams – drums (1)

Production

 Walter Afanasieff – drum and rhythm programming (2, 3), orchestral programming (5, 7, 9)
 Christopher Austopchuk – art direction
 Billy B. – make-up
 Dana Jon Chappelle – music recording (2–8)
 Gary Cirimelli – Macintosh, digital, and synthesizer programming (2–9)
 Robert Clivillés – drums, percussion, and bass programming (6)
 David Cole – drums, percussion, and bass programming (6)
 Brian Devine – hair
 Daniela Federici – photography
 Gus Garces – assistant engineering
 David Gleeson – assistant engineering (2, 7)
 Mick Guzauski – mixing
 Jay Healy – music recording (1, 9–11), vocal recording
 June Hong – design
 Bob Ludwig – mastering
 Mike Scott – assistant engineering
 Dan Shea – additional programming (2, 7)
 Andy Smith – assistant engineering
 Chris Theis – assistant engineering (11)
 T.D. Valentine – home photos
 Basia Zamorska – stylist

Charts

Weekly charts

Year-end charts

All-time charts

Certifications and sales

Release history

See also 
 Merry Christmas II You
 List of best-selling albums by women
 List of best-selling albums in Japan
 List of best-selling Christmas albums in the United States

Notes

References 
 

Mariah Carey albums
1994 Christmas albums
Christmas albums by American artists
Albums produced by Walter Afanasieff
Columbia Records Christmas albums
Contemporary R&B Christmas albums